Young Guard may refer to:
 Young Guard (Napoleon), a French elite military unit during the time of Napoleon Bonaparte
Young Guard, associated with Soviet Union and Russia:
Molodaya Gvardiya (magazine), a monthly literary magazine published since 1922
Molodaya Gvardiya (publisher), a publishing house in the Soviet Union and Russia, established in 1922
Young Guard (Soviet resistance), a Soviet resistance organisation during World War II, composed mainly of teenagers
The Young Guard (novel), a 1945 (rev. 1951) novel by Alexander Fadeyev about the Soviet resistance organisation
The Young Guard (opera), a 1947 opera by Yuliy Meitus, based on Fadeyev's novel
The Young Guard (film), a 1948 Soviet film directed by Sergei Gerasimov, based on Fadeyev's novel
 Young Guard of United Russia, a pro-Kremlin 'direction action' youth organization, youth wing of United Russia
Young Guard (ice hockey team), a Minor Hockey League team based in Donetsk, Ukraine
"Young Guard" (Die Erste Wache!), a 1909 musical score for piano by Harry Appel
 Young Guard (Brazilian movement)